Bismark Ekye (born January 13, 1981, in Accra) is a Ghanaian football defender currently playing for Borgotaro Calcio of Italy.

International
Ekye played his one and only game for the Black Stars on 16 June 2004 against South Africa.

References

External links
 
 Footballplus Profile

1981 births
Living people
Ghanaian footballers
Ghana international footballers
Serie B players
ACF Fiorentina players
Expatriate footballers in Italy
Ravenna F.C. players
Association football defenders
FC Vaduz players
Footballers from Accra
U.S. Pistoiese 1921 players
Expatriate footballers in Liechtenstein
Ghanaian expatriate sportspeople in Italy
Okwawu United players
Ghanaian expatriate sportspeople in Liechtenstein